Serial Killer is an international festival of TV and online series. It is the first event of this kind in Central and Eastern Europe.

The Festival is held annually in Brno, Czech Republic. It aims to offer current and high-quality European series. Most of the screenings, which take place in the cinemas or theaters, consist of the first two episodes of a series. The festival also premiered the #martyisdead web series, which later won the International Emmy Award.

The program of the Festival consists of several sections. In the Main competition section, an international jury announces the Best Central and Eastern European Series. The International panorama section presents series mostly from Western Europe. The Focus section focuses on a series from a different country each year, for example, Denmark, Norway or Great Britain in the past. The Festival also offers industry section TV Days for film and television professionals.

The fourth season of the festival will take place from 20 September to 25 September 2022.

Festival Editions

2018 
The festival took place for the first time from 2 to 5 May in 2018 in Scala Cinema, Bolek Polívka Theater and Husa na Provázku Theater in Brno.

Winners of The Best CEE Series:
 Best TV Series: Cuvar Dvorca (Guardian of the Castle) - 
 Special Jury Mention: Pank (The Bank) - 
 Best Web Series: Lajna (The Line) -

2019 
The 2nd edition of Serial Killer took place from 24 to 29 September 2019 in Brno.

Winners of The Best CEE Series:
 Best TV Series: Nenaste (Blackout) - 
 Special Jury Mention: Bez vědomí (The Sleepers) - 
 Best Web Series: #martyisdead -

2020 
The 3rd edition of Serial Killer took place in hybrid version from 22 to 27 September 2020. Due to the COVID-19 pandemic, the festival offered the series online for free and the physical event took place with limited capacity for three days in the Husa na Provázku Theater.

Winners of The Best CEE Series:
 Best TV Series: Polet (Six Empty Seats) - 
 Special Jury Mention: Reetur (Traitor) - 
 Best Web Series: Terapie Sdílením (Therapy by Sharing) -

2021 
The 4th edition of Serial Killer took place form 21 to 26 September 2021 in Brno.

Winners of The Best CEE Series: 

 Best TV Series: Porodica (The Family) - 
 Special Jury Mention: Klára Melíšková for her performance in a leading role in the series Podezření (Suspicion) - 
 Best Web Series: TBH -

References

External links

 
 
 

Festivals in the Czech Republic
Television festivals